Action Zealandia is a White nationalist and neo-Nazi group in New Zealand that emerged following the Christchurch mosque shooting in 2019 as the successor to an earlier group called the Dominion Movement. According to Newshub, Action Zealandia has restricted its membership to "physically fit, tidy European male[s] of sound mind and good character." In addition to its online activities, the group has plastered stickers, posted banners, and networked with other far right and neo-Nazi groups in New Zealand and abroad. Action Zealandia has also attracted media attention after members made an online threat against Christchurch's Al Noor Mosque, attempted to start a terror cell, purchase weapons, and participated in the 2022 Wellington protest.

Ideology and goals
According to the group's website, Action Zealandia's stated goal is to build a community for European New Zealanders. They claim  that European identity is under threat from so-called "demographic replacement" caused by economically-motivated migration by non-European peoples. Action Zealandia also emphasises masculinity, physical fitness, and condemns drug use and so-called "sexual deviancy." In addition, Action Zealandia promotes nationalism, environmental sustainability and opposes free market capitalism and mass migration as detrimental to national identity and environmental sustainability.

According to the University of Waikato law academic Al Gillespie and Newsroom journalist Marc Daalder, Action Zealandia's ideology blends far right nationalism with left-wing environmentalism. The group's environmentalism is rooted in the pseudohistorical belief that White people settled in New Zealand before the arrival of Māori. Action Zealandia also excludes women, non-white people (including mixed race individuals), the disabled, drug addicts, and obese individuals from membership. Action Zealandia also opposes libertarianism on the grounds that free market capitalism contributes to the "demographic replacement" of European New Zealanders.

Leadership and membership
According to the University of Otago student magazine Critic Te Ārohi journalist Elliott Weir, Action Zealandia had about 30 active members as of August 2021 with at least eight supporters including three women. Although the majority of members are aged between 18 and 35 years, teenagers as young as 13 years of age have attempted to join the group.

As of August 2021, their leader is New Zealand Army reservist and former Army communications specialist James Fairburn, who is known by the codename "Hector." In June 2020, Daalder reported that Fairburn had attempted to use his reservist status to secure an "E" endorsement for his firearms license that would allow him to purchase semi-automatic firearms. Fairburn has participated in far-right Discord channels, promoted the White genocide conspiracy theory, advocated for White South African farmers, and opposed the United Nations' Global Compact for Migration. Fairburn said in January 2023 that he had not been involved with Action Zealandia since September 2021.

History and activities

Dominion Movement
According to the journalist Marc Daalder, Action Zealandia emerged in July 2019 as the successor to the Dominion Movement, a far right group that ceased its activities following the Christchurch mosque shootings in March 2019. The Dominion Movement was a self-described "grass-roots Identitarian activist organisation committed to the revitalisation of our country and our people: White New Zealanders". The group condemned the Christchurch mosque shootings and claimed that it was non-violence. Due to the backlash against far right groups as a result of the shootings, the Dominion Movement ceased operations and shut down its website. In addition, the Dominion Movement opposed consumerism, transgenderism, and immigration.

According to a Stuff report, an alleged co-founder of the Dominion Movement was a New Zealand Defence Force soldier named Johann Wolfe, who was facing court martial in January 2020 for conducting four counts of espionage and two counts of attempted espionage with an undisclosed group.  He was also the first New Zealander to have been charged with espionage. According to The New Zealand Herald, Wolfe was  a founding leader of Action Zealandia and had expressed support for the Christchurch mosque shooter.

While Action Zealandia has denied any connection to the Dominion Movement, Daalder uncovered a set of leaked documents which confirmed that members of Dominion Movement had intentionally established Action Zealandia. These documents instructed members to conceal their connections to the former Dominion Movement and encouraged former Dominion members to lie to other Action Zealandia members about their prior affiliation. As a security precaution, these guidelines also advised former Dominion members to destroy or conceal their branded flags and other memorabilia associated with the Dominion Movement.

Communications output
Action Zealandia maintains a website, which was registered through the Instra Corporation on 23 May 2019. The group also runs a podcast called Voice of Zealandia, which has an associated Facebook page. After Action Zealandia was banned from Twitter and YouTube in June 2021, the group has turned to other social media platforms such as Discord, Gab, Odyssee, Telegram and Element. In October 2021, Stuff reported that Meta Platforms had banned Action Zealandia from Facebook, citing a leaked Facebook list of "Dangerous Individuals and Organisations" obtained by the American media organisation The Intercept.

In addition to their online activities, Action Zealandia has also plastered stickers in public spaces promoting their nationalist ideology. in June 2022, Action Zealandia members unsuccessfully attempted to plaster "White Lives Matter" and "Kyle Rittenhouse Was Right" posters in Dunedin but fled after being confronted by members of the public. In August 2022, the group's leaders ordered its chapters to do banner drops and poster runs in order to promote "White Lives Matter Day" on 9 August. The group wanted to use White Lives Matter Day to raise awareness of alleged White genocide in the South African farm attacks.

Potential crimes
According to Daalder, Action Zealandia was also linked to at least three potential crimes in March 2020 including a member named Sam Brittenden making an online threat against the Al Noor Mosque in Christchurch, posting a leaked New Zealand Police Financial Intelligence unit document, and alleged plans to start a terror cell and purchase weapons from like-minded groups such as the Atomwaffen Division.

Entryism and networking
In August 2021, the Critic Te Arohi journalist Elliot Weir reported an undercover investigation of Action Zealandia, including their plans to infiltrate the National and New Zealand Social Credit parties and planning to appeal to a broader group of people. Action Zealandia has also cultivated relationships with both domestic and overseas White supremacist and neo-Nazi groups and figures including former New Zealand National Front general secretary Kerry Bolton, Thomas Sewell's National Socialist Network, International Conservative Community, Nordic Resistance Movement, New British Union, Blair Cottrell, and Robert Rundo's Rise Above Movement. The International Conservative Community is a transnational network of fascist groups founded by Rundo. Action Zealandia is the New Zealand chapter of the group.

COVID-19 pandemic
During the COVID-19 pandemic in New Zealand, Action Zealandia spread misinformation and conspiracy theories about COVID-19 vaccines, claiming that they were part of a Jewish conspiracy to sterilise and depopulate the world. Members pressured other members not to get vaccinated and discussed ways of circumventing workplace vaccine mandates including falsifying vaccine documents. Action Zealandia also supported 2022 Wellington protest. In mid February 2022, Action Zealandia member Max Newsome, who was a construction crew member, posted a video and photos of the protest from Bowen House. His activities sparked an investigation by law enforcement authorities and prompted Speaker of the House Trevor Mallard to restrict access to Bowen House.

References

External links
 

2019 establishments in New Zealand
Neo-Nazism in New Zealand